Tombstone (Alonzo Thompson Lincoln) is a supervillain appearing in American comic books published by Marvel Comics. Depicted as a hulking albino man with filed teeth, Tombstone is a notorious crime boss in New York City who is primarily an enemy of Spider-Man and Daredevil, the father of Janice Lincoln, and has personal ties with Robbie Robertson.

The character has appeared in several media adaptations outside of comics over the years, including animated series and video games. Tombstone made his cinematic debut in the 2018 animated film Spider-Man: Into the Spider-Verse, voiced by Marvin "Krondon" Jones III.

Publication history
The character was created by Gerry Conway and Alex Saviuk and first appeared in Web of Spider-Man #36 (March 1988). The character was immediately established to have a history with longtime Spider-Man supporting character Joseph "Robbie" Robertson, and was brought on as a regular in The Spectacular Spider-Man, which was then being written by Conway. Conway explained why he created Tombstone: "My general motivation was a need to work with the characters who weren't central to The Amazing Spider-Man title, since that was the main book. That meant I needed to focus my attention not on Aunt May or Mary Jane, or even J. Jonah Jameson, but on second- or even third-tier supporting characters. Joe Robertson was one of those. The second motive had to do with my desire to bring back the ruthless gangster Hammerhead had been, but not Hammerhead himself. It just came to me as a character type. One thing led to another, and as his backstory expanded, readers responded well to it."

Fictional character biography
Born as Lonnie Thompson Lincoln in Harlem, he started out as a troubled youth who was bullied by his peers because he was the neighborhood's only African-American albino. Taller and stronger than the other children, the young Lincoln started his life of crime in school, extorting protection money from his classmates. The school newspaper, edited by Joseph "Robbie" Robertson, was going to run a story exposing these illegal activities, but pulled it when Lincoln used scare tactics to intimidate Robertson. Lincoln allowed his personal demons to direct the course of his life and dropped out to join the ranks of organized crime. As a hitman and enforcer, he used his albinism to his advantage. He filed his teeth and nails to points, giving him the appearance of a vampire. This frequently caught his opponents off-guard, making it easier to kill them. He also lifted weights and engaged in many street fights to hone his fighting skills. One night, Robertson, now working for a local paper, went to meet a source only to see the source being killed by Lincoln. He threatened to kill Robertson if the story was brought out. Robertson kept the secret for over 20 years, allowing Lincoln to continue his rise through the criminal underworld.

Now known as "Tombstone" for the many lives he had taken, he returned to New York City as the Kingpin's top hitman. He threw the Hobgoblin out of the Arranger's window. Later, he captured a mutant known as the Persuader for the Arranger. Tombstone eventually returned to Robertson's neighborhood, where the reporter finally worked up the nerve to challenge him. He revealed the decades-old murder to the police, resulting in Tombstone's arrest, but not before Tombstone confronted and seriously injured Robertson, nearly permanently damaging his spine. Tombstone then encountered Spider-Man in Atlanta; Tombstone was defeated and sent to the Philadelphia State Penitentiary.

Robertson was also incarcerated for suppression of evidence. On learning this, Tombstone obtained a transfer to Lewisburg State Penitentiary where Robertson was serving his sentence. There, he killed an inmate named Bruiser who died trying to protect his friend Robertson. Tombstone eventually broke out of prison but was confronted by Spider-Man; he eluded capture after a harrowing battle in which he nearly beat Spider-Man to death before Robertson stopped him. Tombstone and Robertson were knocked into the Susquehana River. Tombstone brought a badly-injured Robertson to an Amish family so that Robertson could recover enough to give him a decent fight. When Tombstone finally made his move to kill Robertson in retaliation for turning on him during the fight with Spider-Man, Robertson stabbed Tombstone with a pitchfork and then escaped. Tombstone switched allegiances by joining the crime family headed by the Kingpin's rivals Hammerhead and the Chameleon, and then saved Robertson from the Hobgoblin so that he could kill his old foe himself. Robertson earned a full pardon from the government for helping recapture Tombstone.

Tombstone eventually gained a superhuman physical constitution. This was the result of his last attempt to kill Robertson, this time at an Oscorp chemical plant. Robertson shot Tombstone and trapped him in an airtight test chamber which contained an experimental gas. The gas was absorbed into Tombstone's bloodstream and had a mutagenic effect on his body, enhancing his strength and heightening his other physical abilities. Tombstone then called off his vendetta against Robertson in gratitude. Tombstone was later defeated by Daredevil and the Punisher while competing against the Taskmaster in a real game of Assassin sponsored by the Hand. Tombstone was hired by the Green Goblin to be part of the Spider-Man killing group, the Sinister Twelve, but was defeated. Tombstone was hired by Lily Lucca to pretend he kidnapped her as part of a trap for Daredevil, but lost to the hero in physical combat. Tombstone joined the Hood's army of criminals. He later returned to pester Deadpool in the miniseries Deadpool: Suicide Kings. Tombstone was with the Hood when he presents the original Scorpion's costume to whichever low-level crook impresses him until the party is crashed by the Scorpion stealing the costume.

During the "Origin of the Species" storyline, Doctor Octopus invites Tombstone to join a supervillain team in exchange for some items. Later, Tombstone confronts Carlie Cooper. However, the police arrive and Tombstone escapes, but later doubles back to follow Cooper after discovering that Cooper knows who Menace really is. He corners Cooper, Mary Jane Watson and Menace, but Menace manages to knock him out by activating the Goblin Glider and sending it crashing into him. The police soon arrive and take Tombstone away. It is later revealed that Tombstone is the father of the new Beetle (Janice Lincoln). He was contacted by his daughter to help the Sinister Six against the Owl's men.

Tombstone continued to fight Spider-Man. One of his encounters with the police led to Tombstone critically injuring a friend of Yuri Watanabe, a rogue cop who became the fourth Wraith. Tombstone escapes justice with the help of a crooked judge named Howell when Tombstone uses his resources to save his wife from cancer. However, the crime lord Mister Negative supplies Watanabe with evidence of Tombstone's relationship with Howell, putting them both in prison.  Howell is later killed by a prisoner who worked for Tombstone.  When the Black Cat, an Inner Demon disguised as the Crime Master and the Enforcers attempted a jail break, the Inner Demon shot Tombstone in the chest.

After surviving the attempt on his life, Tombstone is later approached by Mr. Fish who warns him about the Black Cat's gang targeting him and his criminal empire in the upcoming gang war in Harlem. Tombstone and Mr. Fish are later visited by Alex Wilder, who talks about his father Geoffrey Wilder's family business, as the two of them knew him back when he was still alive. He also tells Tombstone and Mr. Fish that he is starting a new incarnation of the Pride which will be based in Harlem. Afterwards, Alex beats up Tombstone and uses a magic spell to send Mr. Fish to Hell. After recovering from the attack, Tombstone rescues Mr. Fish from Hell with the help of Black Talon. During the "Infinity Wars" storyline, Tombstone is among the villains that accompany gangster Turk Barrett to his meeting with the Infinity Watch at Central Park. During the "Hunted" storyline, Tombstone was seen as a patron at the Pop-Up with No Name. Tombstone is among the crime lords competing with Mister Negative in obtaining the Tablet of Life and Destiny to win the favor of Mayor Wilson Fisk.

Powers and abilities
Originally, Lonnie Lincoln had no powers, but was simply unnaturally tall with a near-peak human condition. Lincoln later gained actual powers as a result of this mutagenic reaction to an experimental preservative gas absorbed into his bloodstream. He possesses physical strength and reflexes that have been increased far beyond his original limits to abnormal levels. Tombstone's body can withstand extreme temperatures, great impact forces, high caliber bullets, and even toxic vapors without sustaining injury. He has filed all his teeth into razor-sharp points for intimidation on rare occasions. 

Aside from these advantages, he also possesses unarmed combat skills with years of street fighting experience. Before gaining superpowers, Tombstone is capable of killing someone easily with his bare hands. He now combines those skills with physical prowess to create a unique fighting style that relies on intense speed or force to overwhelm his opponents. He is also highly proficient with conventional firearms and well-connected in the world of organized crime.

Tombstone was also usually depicted as only being capable of speaking in whispers. However, after the exposure to Diox-3 at Oscorp, he is depicted speaking in tones approaching normal voice.

Reception
 In 2020, CBR.com ranked the Tombstone 9th in their "Marvel: Dark Spider-Man Villains, Ranked From Lamest To Coolest" list.
 In 2022, Screen Rant included Tombstone in their "10 Spider-Man Villains That Are Smarter Than They Seem" list.
 In 2022, Screen Rant ranked Tombstone 10th in their "10 Most Powerful Silk Villains In Marvel Comics" list.
 In 2022, CBR.com ranked Tombstone 9th in their "10 Most Violent Spider-Man Villains" list.

Other versions

MC2
An older version of Tombstone appears in the Spectacular Spider-Girl digital comic series, set in the MC2 universe. He had been paid by Silvermane to carry out a hit on Spider-Girl. Despite his advanced years, Tombstone still proved to be a tough opponent to defeat.

He met Spider-Girl and did battle with her. But when he saw another Spider-Girl saving people from a burning building on TV, Tombstone grew furious and rapidly finished her off. 

When Tombstone met the Blue Spider-Girl, he revealed to her that he killed the other Spider-Girl, which caused her to attack him in rage. Tombstone was surprised that she has symbiote powers and was defeated. At first thinking he will be on the streets again soon since he believes heroes cannot kill, the Blue Spider-Girl suffocates and kills him.

Cage
Tombstone (known as "Lonnie the Tombstone") appears in the Marvel MAX Cage mini-series. This version of the character has a less monstrous, more realistic appearance with pink skin, blond hair and normal teeth. He becomes embroiled in a brutal gang war with Sonny "The Hammer" Caputo and Clifford "Clifto" Townsend.

Marvel Noir
Tombstone appears in Luke Cage Noir, as an albino Harlem crime lord.

Marvel Adventures
In the Marvel Adventures reality, Tombstone is an enforcer of the Torino crime family. After his fellow mobsters were arrested, Tombstone secretly stole Captain George Stacy's cellphone and lured Gwen Stacy to the subway where he sent the pictures he took of them to her father. Spider-Man arrived telling him to get away from Gwen. Tombstone stated that he didn't abduct or harm Gwen and backed away without a fight. When Captain Stacy arrived to arrest Tombstone and the rest of the gang, Spider-Man and Captain America arrived. It took the combined efforts of Spider-Man, Captain America, and Captain Stacy to defeat Tombstone.

Secret Wars
During the 2015 "Secret Wars" storyline, a version of Tombstone lives in the Battleworld domain of Arachnia. He and Carnage were stalked by Spider-Man Noir and defeated by the Warriors of the Great Web.

In other media

Television 
 Lonnie Lincoln / Tombstone appears in Spider-Man (1994), voiced by Dorian Harewood. This version was left disfigured during a botched robbery turned accident that gave him his superpowers, for which he blamed Robbie Robertson ever since. Tombstone's revenge attempts on his former childhood friend puts him in regular conflict with Spider-Man while under the employ of various crime bosses, such as Silvermane and Richard Fisk.
 Tombstone appears in The Spectacular Spider-Man, voiced initially by Keith David in the pilot episode and by Kevin Michael Richardson in subsequent episodes. This version is the original "Big Man of Crime", a calculating and intelligent crime lord who uses the "public mask" of L. Thompson Lincoln, a benevolent wealthy philanthropist. With Hammerhead as his second, he hires the Enforcers and enlists Norman Osborn to engineer super-villains to distract Spider-Man from his crimes. A gang war later breaks out between Tombstone, Doctor Octopus, and Silvermane over control of New York's criminal underworld, culminating in the three crime lords being pitted against each other and Spider-Man. Following this, Tombstone is defeated and exposed while his crime lord position is taken over by the Green Goblin.
 Lonnie Lincoln will appear in Spider-Man: Freshman Year.

Film
Tombstone appears in Spider-Man: Into the Spider-Verse, voiced by Marvin "Krondon" Jones III. This version serves as the Kingpin's personal bodyguard.

Video games
 Tombstone appears as a boss in Marvel Heroes, voiced by Nolan North.
 Tombstone appears as a boss in Spider-Man (2018), voiced by Corey Jones. This version is a biker gang leader with ties to major criminal outfits throughout New York City who gained his powers after being exposed to experimental Alchemax chemicals as a youth in Harlem. Within the game's continuity, Spider-Man has been a superhero for eight years and is well-familiar with Tombstone and his gang, having encountered them several times in the past. Over time, Tombstone developed a fixation on Spider-Man, viewing him as a "challenge" to work towards overcoming. After making a minor appearance in the main story when Mary Jane Watson discovers Tombstone's men building an armored vehicle for Martin Li, a side mission sees Spider-Man foiling an attempt by Tombstone to sell a new drug called "Grave Dust" that temporarily grants users his powers and developing an antidote that he uses to defeat Tombstone at his hideout.

See also
 List of Spider-Man enemies

References

External links
 
 Tombstone at Marvel.com

Comics characters introduced in 1988
Characters created by Gerry Conway
Fictional African-American people
Fictional businesspeople
Fictional characters from Manhattan
Fictional characters with albinism
Fictional characters with superhuman durability or invulnerability
Fictional crime bosses
Fictional gangsters
Marvel Comics characters with superhuman strength
Marvel Comics male supervillains
Marvel Comics mutates
Marvel Comics supervillains
Spider-Man characters
Villains in animated television series